Rainbow/Q'iwentem Provincial Park  is a recently established 385 hectare provincial park in the Cariboo region of British Columbia. The park was established in 2013, protecting the land between Sulphurous Lake and Deka Lake. While there are no developed trails in the park, existing routes used by locals exist connecting roads on the North Shore of Deka Lake to the North Shore of Sulphurous Lake. The park is accessible by road only from the southwest.

References

Protected areas of British Columbia
Protected areas established in 2013
2013 establishments in British Columbia